The Star Awards for Favourite Female Character was an award presented annually at the Star Awards, a ceremony that was established in 1994.

The category was introduced in 2010, at the 16th Star Awards ceremony; Jeanette Aw received the award for her role in Together and it is given in honour of an actress (not necessary to be contracted under Mediacorp) who portrayed a drama series or variety character that is deemed the most popular among the television audience. Prior to 2012, the nominees were determined by a team of judges employed by Mediacorp. The rule was removed in 2012 to allow the public to determine the nominees entirely via online voting. Winners are also selected by a majority vote from the public via online voting as well.

Since its inception, the award was given to only two actresses. Chantalle Ng is the most recent winner in this category for her role in My Star Bride. Aw is also the only actress to win in this category four times, surpassing Rui En who has three wins. In addition, Rui En has been nominated on eight occasions, more than any other actress. Felicia Chin holds the record for the most nominations without a win, with five.

The award was discontinued from 2017, along with the Favourite Male Character and Favourite Onscreen Couple (Drama) awards.

In 2022, the award was revived but came under a new name called Favourite Female Show Stealer. Also, Favourite Onscreen Couple (Drama) came with a new name Favourite Couple and Favourite Male Character came with a new name Favourite Male Show Stealer.

Recipients

|}
 Each year is linked to the article about the Star Awards held that year.

Category facts

Most wins

Most nominations

References

External links 

Star Awards